Cilano may refer to:
Cosmo A. Cilano, American politician
Cara Cilano, American professor and author